The Province of North Carolina General Assembly of 1775 was a bicameral legislative body of the Province of North Carolina that met from April 4, 1775 to April 8, 1775 in New Bern.  The upper house of the legislature was the Executive Council, which was appointed by The Crown as was the Governor, Josiah Martin.  The lower house, the House of Burgesses, was elected by the eligible voters in the 34 counties and nine major towns as certified by the local sheriff.

This was the fourth House of Burgesses under Governor Josiah Martin and the final General Assembly of the Province of North Carolina. They met at the same time and with virtually the same representation as the Second North Carolina Provincial Congress, which met in New Bern on April 3 to April 7, 1775.  Because the House of Burgesses approved the Continental Congress that was to be held in Philadelphia on May 10, 1775, Governor Martin and the Executive Council issued a proclamation dissolving the House of Burgesses on April 8, 1775.

Executive Council

The last Governor of the Province of North Carolina was Josiah Martin, who served from 1771 to 1776. His Executive Council, which was the upper house of the general assembly and advisor to the governor, included the following members:
 Samuel Cornell
 William Dry
 George Mercer (Lieutenant Governor)
 James Hasell (Chief Baron of the Exchequer, Acting Governor of the Province of North Carolina in 1771)
 Martin Howard
 Alexander McCulloch
 Robert Palmer
 John Rutherfurd (Receiver General)
 Lewis Henry De Rosset
 John Sampson
 Samuel Strudwick (Clerk)
 Thomas McGuire (Attorney General)

Governor Josiah Martin and the Executive Council issued a proclamation on April 8, 1775 dissolving the Province of North Carolina's General Assembly after the House of Burgesses presented a resolve endorsing the Continental Congress that was to be held in Philadelphia, Pennsylvania.  The Executive Council met on June 25, 1775 at Fort Johnston in Brunswick County. By this time sedition was rampant and many were under arms. As the Council met for the last time onboard  in the Cape Fear River on July 18, 1775, they noted that the "deluded people of this Province" will see their error and return to their allegiance to the King.

House of Burgesses

The delegates to the House of Burgesses represented the 34 counties and nine Towns.  The number of delegates from the counties was determined by the population and varied from one to four.  Each town had one delegate.  Elections were certified by the county sheriffs.  The delegates are listed below.  John Harvey was elected speaker of the House of Burgesses by his fellow delegates.

Notes:

See also
 Province of North Carolina
 History of North Carolina

References

Province of North-Carolina
Members of the North Carolina House of Burgesses
Members of the North-Carolina Provincial Council
Political history of North Carolina